Makadara is a residential neighbourhood in the city of Nairobi.

Location
It is straddled by Jogoo Road to the north. It borders other neighbourhoods such as Buruburu, Bahati and Industrial Area; it contains Hamza and Maringo.

Overview
Makadara is generally a high-density housing and low-income to middle-income neighbourhood with a mixture of mid-rises and old bungalows. Residents of Makadara struggle with limited infrastructure, with unpaved roads in some areas and insufficient water.

Makadara Constituency and Makadara Sub-county both borrow their names from the estate. Both are electoral and administrative divisions of Nairobi.

References

 

Suburbs of Nairobi